Named after the saddle-like appearance provided by twin peaks, Packsaddle Mountain is a landmark hill that stands five miles southwest of Kingsland, Texas in eastern Llano County on State Highway 71 and is of interest to both historians and geologists. In 1873 it was the site of the Packsaddle Mountain Fight, the last major Native American battle in the area. The mountain is now part of a large ranch called Packsaddle Ranch.

History
It is thought that the Spanish mined the mountain for gold prior to the Texas Revolution and that it was the site of Los Almagres, Jim Bowie’s famous lost mine. Prospecting on Packsaddle Mountain renewed interest in gold mining in Llano County in the 1920s, but with no lasting result.

The mountain was the site of the Packsaddle Mountain Fight with 21 Apache Tribesmen on August 4, 1873 and was the last major Indian battle in the area. The fight on Packsaddle Mountain was precipitated when a woman from the Moss Ranch (in what is now Llano County) came into the ranch house with an arrow sticking out of her side. A party of eight ranchers, including W.B. Moss and his two brothers, was raised to pursue the raiders. They found some twenty-one Apaches encamped on Packsaddle Mountain. In the ensuing fight at least three tribesmen were killed and three ranchers wounded. 

The Texas state historical marker reads "Two and one half miles east on the Packsaddle Mountain, in a battle fought August 4, 1873, Captain J. R. Moss, Stephen B. Moss, William B. Moss, Eli Lloyd, Arch Martin, Pink Ayers, E. D. Harrington and Robert Brown routed a band of Indians thrice their number. The last Apache battle in this region." The Apache tribes had been encroaching Tonkawa tribal areas for some time.

Geography
At an elevation of 1,628 feet, the higher of the two summits rises 650 feet above Highway 71. Local topography ranges from flat to rolling to steep, with local escarpments, covered with soils ranging from shallow and stony to deep, fine, sandy loam. Vegetation consists primarily of open stands of live oak and Ashe juniper.

Pictures

References

External links

Landforms of Llano County, Texas
Mountains of Texas